Dong Ying (born September 5, 1972 in Nanhui, Shanghai) is a Chinese female sprint canoer who competed in the mid-1990s. She won a silver medal in the K-4 500 m event at the 1995 ICF Canoe Sprint World Championships in Duisburg, Germany.

Ying also finished fourth in the K-4 500 m event at the 1996 Summer Olympics in Atlanta after finishing third in the preliminaries.

References

Sports-reference.com profile

1975 births
Living people
Canoeists from Shanghai
Olympic canoeists of China
Canoeists at the 1996 Summer Olympics
Asian Games medalists in canoeing
ICF Canoe Sprint World Championships medalists in kayak
Canoeists at the 1990 Asian Games
Canoeists at the 1994 Asian Games
Chinese female canoeists
Asian Games gold medalists for China
Medalists at the 1990 Asian Games
Medalists at the 1994 Asian Games